Vanguard Youth is a common and useful name for youth organization of a Maoist party or other left parties. It may refer to:

 Vanguard Youth (Vietnam)
 Vanguard Youth (Turkey)